Juniperic acid or 16-hydroxyhexadecanoic acid is an omega-hydroxy long-chain fatty acid that is palmitic acid which is substituted at position 16 by a hydroxy group. Palmitic acid is converted to juniperic acid by cytochrome P450 various enzymes, including CYP704B22.

Juniperic acid is a key monomer of cutin in the plant cuticle.  It has a role as a plant metabolite.

References 

Fatty acids
Hydroxy acids